Samy Mohamed Rashad Mahmoud Ahmed Kandil El-Baz (born April 25, 1990) is an Egyptian who lives and performs in South Korea as a television personality. He was a cast member in the talk show Non-Summit. And also he was cast member in the variety show Hello! Stranger.

Filmography

Television series

References

External links

1990 births
Living people
Egyptian television personalities
Egyptian expatriates in South Korea
People from Mansoura, Egypt
Ain Shams University alumni
Seoul National University alumni